Haro may refer to:

Places
Los Haro, a town in Jerez, Zacatecas, Mexico
Haro, La Rioja, a town in Spain
 Haro Maya (woreda), Ethiopia
Haro River, a river in Pakistan
Haró, the Hungarian name for Hărău Commune, Hunedoara County, Romania
Haro Strait, between British Columbia, Canada and Washington, United States
Haro Woods, an urban forest in the Municipality of Saanich, British Columbia

People
Haro (surname)
House of Haro, Spanish nobility
Haro Aso, Japanese manga artist

Other uses
Haro Bikes, a BMX bicycle manufacturer
Haro (character), a fictional robot in the Gundam metaseries
Help a Reporter Out (HARO), a website that connects reporters with experts

See also 
Clameur de haro, an ancient legal injunction